Anthony Daniel Contreras Enríquez (born 29 January 2000) is a Costa Rican footballer who plays as a forward for Herediano. He is set to make. Loan move to Atk mohunbagan with option to buy clause.

Club career

Herediano
Contreras joined C.S. Herediano in 2015, after he was spotted by a scout in a game for a club in Zapote, at the age of 15. He then went on a trial at the club and then joined the club permanently. Before that, Contreras had never played for a club.

23 months after joining Herediano, on 15 January 2017, he got his official debut for the club in the Liga FPD against Belén FC at the age of 16. Contreras started on the bench, coming on as a substitute for Heyreel Saravia in the 90th minute. This game was his only appearance in the 2017-18 season. In the following season, he only made one appearance, while he made zero in the 2018-19 season. To gain some experience, he was loaned out to La U Universitarios in the summer 2019 for the rest of the year, where he played 20 games as scored six goals.

On 13 December 2019 it was confirmed, that Contreras would be playing the rest of the 2019-20 season on loan for Municipal Grecia, as well as six other players that Grecia had loaned from Herediano. Contreras played 15 games and scores six goals for the club.

Herediano announced in June 2020, that Contreras had returned to the club. Contreras participated in the teams pre-season and was also on the bench for a cup game in August 2020. However, on 15 September 2020, he was sent out on loan for the third time, this time to Guadalupe FC for the rest of 2020.

Returning from loan in January 2021, Contreras became a regular player for Herediano and made 26 league appearances from January to June 2021. However, on 21 June 2021, Contreras was loaned out to AD Guanacasteca for the rest of 2021.

International career
In November 2019, Contreras was called up for the Costa Rican national team's pre-squad.

Contreras was also a part of the Costa Rican U23 national team that was called up for the 2020 CONCACAF Men's Olympic Qualifying Championship in March 2020.

Contreras made his debut for the senior Costa Rica national football team on 12 November 2021 in a World Cup qualifier against Canada. Contreras scored his first goal for the national team on 27 March 2022 during a 2022 FIFA World Cup qualifier against El Salvador.

Career statistics

International
Scores and results list Costa Rica's goal tally first.

References

External links
 

Living people
2000 births
Association football forwards
Costa Rican footballers
Costa Rica youth international footballers
Costa Rica international footballers
Liga FPD players
C.S. Herediano footballers
Municipal Grecia players
Guadalupe F.C. players
People from Heredia (canton)
2022 FIFA World Cup players